
Year 833 (DCCCXXXIII) was a common year starting on Wednesday (link will display the full calendar) of the Julian calendar.

Events 
 By place 
 Byzantine Empire 
 Byzantine-Arab War: Emperor Theophilos signs an armistice for peace with the Abbasid Caliphate. He offers Caliph Al-Ma'mun 100,000 gold dinars, in return for 7,000 Byzantine prisoners.

 Europe 
 June – Lothair I, eldest son of Emperor Louis the Pious, joins the rebellion of his brothers Pepin I and Louis the German, with the assistance of Archbishop Ebbo. Louis is forced to abdicate, on the plains of Rothfield (near Colmar). 
 Mojmir I, Moravian duke, expels Prince Pribina from his homeland (western part of modern Slovakia). He unifies Great Moravia and becomes the first known ruler of the Moravian Slavs, who founds the House of Mojmir (approximate date).
 Galindo Aznárez I, Frankish count, usurps the Catalan counties (pagi) of Pallars and Ribagorza, in the Spanish March (modern Spain), a buffer zone between the Pyrenees and the Ebro River.

 Abbasid Caliphate 

 August 7 – Caliph Al-Ma'mun dies after a 20-year reign. He is succeeded two days later by his half-brother al-Mu'tasim, as ruler of the Abbasid Caliphate.
 Ibn Hisham, Muslim historian, collects oral traditions that form the basis for the biography of the Islamic prophet Muhammad.

 Japan 
 Emperor Junna abdicates the throne, after a 10-year reign. He is succeeded by his nephew Nimmyō, as the 54th emperor of Japan.

Births 
 Irmgard, Frankish abbess (or 830)
 Kocel, Slavic prince (approximate date)
 Luo Yin, Chinese statesman and poet (d. 910)
 Yi Zong, emperor of the Tang Dynasty (d. 873)

Deaths 
 May 7 – Ibn Hisham, Muslim historian
 July 20 or 834 – Ansegisus, Frankish abbot
 August 9 – Al-Ma'mun, Muslim caliph (b. 786)
 Conchobar mac Donnchada, High King of Ireland
 Diarmait mac Tommaltaig, king of Connacht (Ireland)
 Dou Yizhi, chancellor of the Tang Dynasty
 Du Yuanying, chancellor of the Tang Dynasty (b. 769)
 Enravota, ruler of the Bulgarian Empire (approximate date)
 García Galíndez (the Bad), count of Aragon
 Nagabhata II, ruler of the Gurjara-Pratihara Dynasty
 Song Shenxi, chancellor of the Tang Dynasty
 Yuthog Yontan Gonpo, Tibetan high priest (b. 708)

References